Garden Homes is an American real estate development company, founded in 1954. Garden Homes owns and manages over 50,000 apartments and over 25 million square feet of retail, office, and hotel space.

Garden Homes, and its subsidiaries, offer home rentals in Arizona, California, Florida, New Jersey, New York and Connecticut. Subsidiaries include Garden Commercial Properties and Skyline Developers.

History
Garden Homes was founded in 1954 by the brothers Harry and Joseph Wilf, and is now run by
Leonard, Zygmunt, Mark, Orin and Jonathan Wilf. 

Garden Homes is based in Short Hills, New Jersey, and the Wilf family has a net worth of US$5 billion as of 2015.

References

External links

Real estate companies established in 1954
American companies established in 1954
Companies based in Essex County, New Jersey
Construction and civil engineering companies of the United States
Real estate services companies of the United States
Wilf family
Millburn, New Jersey